Bakchon Station is a subway station on Line 1 of the Incheon Subway in Gyeyang-gu, Incheon, South Korea

Station layout
The platform has two island platforms and three tracks commonly referred to as “three-tracks, two-island”, and has a screen door installed. Under normal circumstances, only unloaded and commercial ships are used for business. Parks arriving and departing from and arriving at Barkchon also handle passengers at the top and bottom platforms respectively.

From the beginning of the opening, the mid-line was used to return and handle passengers on trains that repeatedly run between Bakchon and Dongmak. However, due to the abolition of the train, as of May 2019, it will be used in emergencies, such as vehicle replacement due to obstacles, as well as in trains leaving the vehicle base. The middle line toward Gyulhyeon is not connected to the mainline.

Exits

References

External links

Metro stations in Incheon
Seoul Metropolitan Subway stations
Railway stations in South Korea opened in 1999
Gyeyang District